Cape Mudge Lighthouse is located on Quadra Island which is off Campbell River, on the east coast of Vancouver Island, British Columbia, Canada.

Cape Mudge was named by Captain George Vancouver in 1792 after Zachary Mudge, who had served on HMS Discovery, and in 1796 on HMS Providence in this area.

Built in 1898, the original lighthouse was a wooden, two-storey building topped with a lantern on the roof. It later served as lighthouse assistant keeper's residence after the current lighthouse opened in 1916 and was demolished after 1949.

From 1936 to 1985, the Cape Mudge Lighthouse was part of the British Columbia Shore Station Oceanographic Program, collecting coastal water temperature and salinity measurements for the Department of Fisheries and Oceans everyday for 49 years.

See also
 List of lighthouses in British Columbia
 List of lighthouses in Canada

References

External links

 Aids to Navigation Canadian Coast Guard

Lighthouses in British Columbia
Heritage sites in British Columbia
Lighthouses on the Canadian Register of Historic Places